Gobinda Chandra High School was established in 1969 in the district of Jajpur in Odisha, India.

Campus and building
The school is situated in aunri panchayat near the villages such as Dihakula,aunri, kuanrpur, gobindpur
. It has three large halls, a two storage hudco building and a separate building for office, teacher's common room and headmaster's chamber.

References

Schools in Odisha
1969 establishments in Orissa
Educational institutions established in 1969